A vessel sank on the 22 of September 2022 off the coast of Tartus, Syria, carrying people from Syria, Lebanon and Palestine. The victims are estimated to be around 150 men, women, children and elders. It has been described as one of the deadliest shipwrecks in the eastern Mediterranean in recent years.

Incident 
The ship disembarked on the 20 of September from Miniyeh, near Tripoli, on the northern coast of Lebanon, carrying around 170 people. Mostly Lebanese, Palestinians and Syrians trying to escape the harsh conditions created by the Lebanese liquidity crisis. The destination of the ship was Italy. The boat sank off the coast of Tartus, about 50 km north of Tripoli, its starting point. According to eye witnesses the boat was carrying many more people than what it was supposed to hold, bad weather and large waves also contributed to the disaster, survivors had to swim for hours to reach rescue vessels.

The Syrian Ministry of Transport stated that most of the victims and survivors were found near Arwad Island. The Syrian coastguard and rescue workers, including a Russian search party, was able to save 21 people, 30 people remain missing, 20 injured victims as well as bodies were taken to Al-Basel Hospital in Tartus. Rescue operations were halted overnight due to the weather condiitons, including high waves. UNICEF reported that at least 10 children were among the victims. While later the number rose to 24. Out of 34 women only 1 survived. According to Lebanon’s transport minister, Ali Hamie, the survivors included 12 Syrians, 5 Lebanese and 3 Palestinians.

UNHCR has provided material support to survivors in Tarsus. In the following days the Syrian Red Crescent transported the bodies of Lebanese and Palestinian victims to the Arida border crossing where they were received by the Lebanese Red Cross. The boat was carrying 39 Palestinians, 35 from Nahr al-Bared refugee camp and 4 from Shatila refugee camp in Lebanon. The majority of the victims were Syrians from Idlib, Aleppo and Latakia.

The Lebanese army arrested an individual believed to be related to the smuggling.

Background 
According to UNHCR the number of migrants attempting the dangerous journey from Lebanon to Europe more than doubled in 2022 for the second year in a row, while the primary destination for the smuggler boats has shifted from Cyprus to Italy. The main reason behind the increase is the worsening Lebanese economic crisis and a lack of jobs. The majority of people fleeing from Lebanon are Syrian refugees while Lebanese and Palestinian refugees in Lebanon are in smaller numbers. Additionally UNICEF reported that "years of political instability and economic crisis in Lebanon have pushed many children and families into poverty". The economic situation in the north of Lebanon is more acute with common water and power cuts.

Reactions 

 In a joint statement IOM, UNHCR, and UNRWA have "called on coastal states to increase efforts to build their capacity to provide search and rescue services and to work to ensure predictability in identifying safe places of disembarkation. However, it is even more critical that action be taken to address the root causes of these movements and for the international community, in line with the principle of responsibility-sharing, to strengthen access to safer, alternative pathways to stop people resorting to dangerous journeys. Much more humanitarian and development support must also go to those displaced and host communities throughout the region to help stem their suffering and improve their living conditions and opportunities. Failing this, refugees, asylum-seekers, migrants, and internally displaced people will continue to take dangerous journeys in search of safety, protection, and a better life."
 Filippo Grandi, United Nations High Commissioner for Refugees: “This is yet another heart-wrenching tragedy and we extend our deepest condolences to all those impacted. We call for full solidarity from the international community to help improve the conditions of forcibly displaced people and host communities in the Middle East, particularly in countries neighboring Syria. Too many people are being pushed to the brink.”
 António Vitorino, IOM Director General: “People looking for safety should not be compelled to take such perilous and often deadly migration journeys. We must work together to increase safe and legal pathways to regular migration to help reduce loss of life and protect vulnerable people on the move."
 Philippe Lazzarini, UNRWA Commissioner-General: “This is just tragic. No one gets on these death boats lightly. People are taking this perilous decisions, risking their lives in search of dignity. We must do more to offer a better future and address a sense of hopelessness in Lebanon and across the region, including among Palestine refugees.”
 Adele Khodr, UNICEF Regional Director for the Middle East and North Africa: “UNICEF is deeply saddened by reports that several children are among those who lost their lives when a boat sank off the coast of Tartus, Syria last night, claiming dozens of lives, including children. Our thoughts and condolences go to their families whose lives have been devastated by this tragedy."

See also 

 List of migrant vessel incidents on the Mediterranean Sea

References 

Migrant boat disasters in the Mediterranean Sea
Maritime incidents in 2022
2022 in Syria
2022 disasters in Syria